Christen Andersen Vallesværd (1797–1842) was a Norwegian politician.

He was elected to the Norwegian Parliament in 1833, representing the constituency of Nedenes og Robygdelagets Amt. He worked as a farmer there. He served only one term.

References

1797 births
1842 deaths
Members of the Storting
Aust-Agder politicians